Ranked lists of country subdivisions.

Economics 
 List of country subdivisions by GDP
 List of country subdivisions by GDP over 100 billion US dollars
 List of governments in Canada by annual expenditures
 List of Romanian counties by foreign trade
 List of Ukrainian oblasts and territories by salary

Geography 
 List of Brazilian states by highest point

Population 
 List of federal subjects of Russia by population
 List of South African provinces by population density
 List of U.S. states by population density

See also
 
 
 

 
International rankings by country
country subdivisions